Dolben is a surname. Notable people with the surname include:

John Dolben (1625–1686), English priest
William Dolben ( 1588–1631), Welsh priest
Dolben baronets, from 1704 to 1837